

Events

January

 January 1
 United Nations Secretary-General Kurt Waldheim heralds the start of the International Year of the Child. Many musicians donate to the Music for UNICEF Concert fund, among them ABBA, who write the song Chiquitita to commemorate the event.
 The United States and the People's Republic of China establish full diplomatic relations.
 Following a deal agreed during 1978, French carmaker Peugeot completes a takeover of American manufacturer Chrysler's European operations, which are based in Britain's former Rootes Group factories, as well as the former Simca factories in France.
 January 7 – Cambodian–Vietnamese War: The People's Army of Vietnam and Vietnamese-backed Cambodian insurgents announce the fall of Phnom Penh, Cambodia, and the collapse of the Pol Pot regime. Pol Pot and the Khmer Rouge retreat west to an area along the Thai border, ending large-scale fighting. 
 January 8 – Whiddy Island Disaster: The French tanker Betelgeuse explodes at the Gulf Oil terminal at Bantry, Ireland; 50 are killed.
 January 9 – The Music for UNICEF Concert is held at the United Nations General Assembly to raise money for UNICEF and promote the Year of the Child. It is broadcast the following day in the United States and around the world. Hosted by the Bee Gees, other performers include Donna Summer, ABBA, Rod Stewart and Earth, Wind & Fire. A soundtrack album is later released.
 January 16 – Shah Mohammad Reza Pahlavi flees Iran with his family, relocating to Egypt after a year of turmoil.
 January 19 – Former U.S. Attorney General John N. Mitchell is released on parole after 19 months at a federal prison in Alabama.
 January 22 – Uganda–Tanzania War: Battle of Mutukula: The Tanzanian military captures the Ugandan border town of Mutukula after a short battle.
 January 25 – Pope John Paul II arrives in Mexico City for his first visit to Mexico, mainly for 1979's Latin American Episcopal Conference (CELAM) or Conference of Puebla.
 January 28 - Deng Xiaoping arrives in Washington, D.C. for the first visit of a paramount leader of the People's Republic of China to the United States.

February 

 February 1 - Ayatollah Ruhollah Khomeini returns to Tehran, Iran after nearly 15 years of exile.
 February 3 – Ayatollah Khomeini creates the Council of the Islamic Revolution.
 February 7
 Iranian Revolution: Supporters of Ayatollah Khomeini take over the Iranian law enforcement, courts, and government administration; the final session of the Iranian National Consultative Assembly is held.
 Pluto moves inside Neptune's orbit for the first time since either was known to science.
 Nazi criminal Josef Mengele suffers a stroke and drowns while swimming in Bertioga, Brazil. His remains are found in 1985.
 February 10–11 – The Iranian Revolution ends with the Iranian army withdrawing to its barracks leaving power in the hands of Ayatollah Khomeini, ending the Pahlavi dynasty.
 February 11 – Uganda–Tanzania War: Battle of Simba Hills: The Tanzanian military began its assault on the Simba Hills near the town of Kakuuto.
 February 12 – Prime Minister Hissène Habré starts the Battle of N'Djamena in an attempt to overthrow Chad's President Félix Malloum.
 February 13 
 The Guardian Angels are formed in New York City as an unarmed organization of young crime fighters.
 February 14 – In Kabul, Muslim extremists kidnap the American ambassador to Afghanistan, Adolph Dubs, who is killed during a gunfight between his kidnappers and police.
 February 15 – A suspected gas explosion in a Warsaw bank kills 49.
 February 17 – The People's Republic of China invades northern Vietnam, launching the Sino-Vietnamese War.
 February 18
The 1979 Daytona 500 is televised on CBS, the first ever full airing of a 500-mile race on US television, Richard Petty wins after Cale Yarborough and Donnie Allison battle for first place on the final lap and crash out, leading to a fist fight. This race brought NASCAR to a wider audience.
 The Khomeini government in Iran cuts diplomatic relations with Israel.
 February 21 –  Uganda–Tanzania War: Battle of Gayaza Hills: A Tanzanian brigade successfully dislodged Ugandan forces from the Gayaza Hills. The battle is hard-fought, and the Tanzanians suffer their largest number of casualties in a single engagement of the war.
 February 22 – Saint Lucia becomes independent from the United Kingdom.
 February 26
 A total solar eclipse, the last visible from the continental United States until 2017, arcs over northwestern conterminous USA and central Canada ending in Greenland. A partial solar eclipse is visible over almost all of North America and Central America including the eastern half of Alaska and the western half of the UK.
 The Superliner railcar enters revenue service with Amtrak.
 February 27
The annual Mardi Gras celebration in New Orleans is cancelled due to a strike called by the New Orleans Police Department.
The Soviet oil tanker Antonio Gramsci suffers a minor shipwreck in shallow waters shortly after leaving shore in Ventspils, resulting in a 5,000 ton oil spill, the largest that has ever occurred on the Baltic Sea.

March 

 March 1
 Scottish devolution referendum: Scotland votes in favour of a Scottish Assembly, which is not implemented due to failing a condition that at least 40% of the electorate must support the proposal; in a Welsh devolution referendum, Wales votes against devolution.
 Philips publicly demonstrate a prototype of an optical digital audio disc at a press conference in Eindhoven, Netherlands.
 March 2 – Uganda–Tanzania War: Battle of Tororo: Ugandan rebels attack and capture the town of Tororo.
 March 4
 The U.S. Voyager 1 spaceprobe photos reveal Jupiter's rings.
 Uganda–Tanzania War: Battle of Tororo: The Ugandan military retakes Tororo from rebels.
 March 7 – The largest Magnetar (Soft gamma repeater) event is recorded.
 March 8
Philips demonstrates the compact disc publicly for the first time.
 Thousands of women participate in the International Women's Day Protests in Tehran, 1979 against the introduction of mandatory veiling during the Iranian revolution.
 Images taken by Voyager I proved the existence of volcanoes on Io, a moon of Jupiter.
 March 10 – Uganda–Tanzania War: Battle of Lukaya: The Ugandan military, a Libyan expeditionary force and allied Palestine Liberation Organisation militants begin a counter-offensive against Tanzanian troops in south-central Uganda. The Ugandan-led alliance retakes Lukaya after a short clash with the Tanzanian military.
 March 11 – Uganda–Tanzania War: Battle of Lukaya: The Tanzanian military counter-attacks at Lukaya, completely defeating the Ugandan-led alliance. This defeat permanently cripples the Ugandan military.
 March 13 – Maurice Bishop leads a successful coup in Grenada. His government will be crushed by American intervention in 1983.
 March 14 – In China, a Hawker Siddeley Trident crashes into a factory near Beijing, killing 31 people on the ground and injuring 200.
 March 16
End of major hostilities in the Sino-Vietnamese War.
 In his letter to the United Nations, Elisio De Figueiredo, the People's Republic of Angola's Permanent Representative to the United Nations, requests an urgent meeting of the United Nations Security Council on the question of South Africa's continuous acts of aggression in Angola.
 March 17 – The Penmanshiel Tunnel in the UK collapses, killing two workers.
 March 19 - C-SPAN, an American television channel focusing on government and public affairs, is launched.
 March 18 – Ten miners die in a methane gas explosion at Golborne Colliery near Wigan, Greater Manchester, England.
 March 22 – The NHL votes to approve its merger with the WHA, effective in the fall.
 March 25 – The first fully functional Space Shuttle orbiter, Columbia, is delivered to the Kennedy Space Center, to be prepared for its first launch.
 March 26 
 In a ceremony at the White House, President Anwar Sadat of Egypt and Prime Minister Menachem Begin of Israel sign an Egypt–Israel peace treaty.
 Michigan State University, led by Earvin "Magic" Johnson, defeats Larry Bird-led Indiana State 75–64 in the NCAA tournament championship game at Salt Lake City. 
 March 28
 In Britain, James Callaghan's minority Labour government loses a motion of confidence by one vote, forcing a general election which is to be held on 3 May.
 America's most serious nuclear power plant accident occurs, at Three Mile Island, Pennsylvania.
 March 29 – Sultan Yahya Petra of Kelantan, the 6th Yang di-Pertuan Agong (Head of State) of Malaysia, dies in office. He is replaced by Sultan Ahmad Shah of Pahang.
 March 30 – Airey Neave, Conservative M.P. in the British House of Commons, is killed, presumably by an Irish National Liberation Army bomb in the car park for the Houses of Parliament.
 March 31
 The last British soldier (belonging to the Royal Navy) leaves the Maltese Islands, after 179 years of presence. Malta declares its Freedom Day (Jum il-Helsien).
 Milk and Honey win the Eurovision Song Contest 1979 for Israel, with the song Hallelujah.

April

 April 1
 Iran's government becomes an Islamic Republic by a 98% vote, overthrowing the Shah officially.
 Nickelodeon launches from QUBE's Pinwheel experiment and begins airing on various Warner Cable systems beginning in Buffalo, New York, expanding its audience reach.
Dale Earnhardt Sr wins his first career NASCAR race at the 1979 Southeastern 500 at Bristol Motor Speedway. He would go on to win 76 races and 7 championships during his career.
 April 1–18 – Police lock Andreas Mihavecz in a holding cell in Bregenz, Austria and forget about him, leaving him there without food or drink.
 April 2 – Sverdlovsk anthrax leak: A Soviet biowarfare laboratory at Sverdlovsk accidentally releases airborne anthrax spores, killing 66 plus an unknown amount of livestock. It is a violation of the Biological Weapons Convention of 1972.
 April 2 - In Japan, the channel of TV Asahi premieres Doraemon.
 April 4 – Pakistani Prime Minister Zulfiqar Ali Bhutto is executed by hanging for the murder of a political opponent.
 April 6 – Student protests break out in Nepal.
 April 7 – In Japan, Yoshiyuki Tomino directs Mobile Suit Gundam, the first series of the metaseries of the same name.
 April 10 – A tornado hits Wichita Falls, Texas, killing 42 people (the most notable of 26 tornadoes that day).
 April 11 – Uganda–Tanzania War: Fall of Kampala: Tanzanian troops take Kampala, the capital of Uganda; Idi Amin flees.
 April 13 – The La Soufrière volcano erupts in St. Vincent and the Grenadines.
 April 14 – The Progressive Alliance of Liberia stages a protest, without a permit, against an increase in rice prices proposed by the government, with clashes between protestors and the police resulting over 70 deaths and over 500 injured.
 April 15 – 1979 Montenegro earthquake: A 6.9  shock affects Montenegro (then part of Yugoslavia) and parts of Albania, causing extensive damage to coastal areas and taking 136 lives; the old town of Budva is devastated.
 April 17 – Schoolchildren in the Central African Republic are arrested (and around 100 killed) for protesting against compulsory school uniforms. An African judicial commission later determines that Emperor Jean-Bédel Bokassa "almost certainly" took part in the massacre.
 April 22 – The Albert Einstein Memorial is unveiled at the National Academy of Sciences in Washington, D.C.
 April 23 – Fighting breaks out in London between the Anti-Nazi League and the Metropolitan Police's Special Patrol Group; protester Blair Peach receives fatal injuries during the incident, now officially attributed to the SPG.

May

 May 1 – Greenland is granted limited autonomy from Denmark, with its own Parliament sitting in Nuuk.
 May 3 – The 1979 United Kingdom general election for the House of Commons takes place, giving the Conservatives a majority, and electing Margaret Thatcher as the nation's first woman prime minister, ending the rule of James Callaghan's Labour government.
 May 8 – Ten shoppers die in a fire at the Woolworths department store in Manchester city centre in England.
 May 9
 The Salvadoran Civil War begins.
 The Unabomber bomb injures Northwestern University graduate student John Harris.
 May 10 – The Federated States of Micronesia becomes self-governing.
 May 15 – Uganda–Tanzania War: Battle of Lira: Tanzania and its Uganda National Liberation Front allies capture Lira, Uganda, from the forces of Ugandan dictator Idi Amin.
 May 21
 Dan White is convicted of manslaughter, rather than murder, for the assassination of San Francisco Mayor George Moscone and Supervisor Harvey Milk, after using what would become known as the "Twinkie defense" and persuading a jury that the crime was not premeditated. The maximum sentence is seven years imprisonment, with eligibility for early parole, prompting the "White Night riots" in the gay community.  
 The Montreal Canadiens defeat the New York Rangers four games to one to win their fourth consecutive Stanley Cup.
 May 25
 American Airlines Flight 191: In Chicago, a DC-10 crashes during takeoff at O'Hare International Airport, killing all 271 on board and 2 people on the ground in the deadliest aviation accident in U.S. history.
 John Spenkelink is executed in Florida, in the first use of the electric chair in America after the reintroduction of the death penalty in 1976.
 Etan Patz, 6 years old, is kidnapped in New York. He is often referred to as the "Boy on the Milk Carton" and the investigation later sprouts into one of the most famous child abduction cases of all time. This is a cold case until 2010 when it is re-opened. In April 2017, Pedro Hernandez is convicted of the murder and kidnapping and sentenced to life imprisonment.
 May 27 – Indianapolis 500: Rick Mears wins the race for the first time, and car owner Roger Penske for the second time.

June 

 June 1
 The Vizianagaram district is formed in Andhra Pradesh, India.
 The first black-led government of Rhodesia in 90 years takes power, in succession to Ian Smith and under his power-sharing deal, in the unrecognized republic of Zimbabwe Rhodesia.
 The Seattle SuperSonics win the NBA Championship against the Washington Bullets.
 June 2
 Pope John Paul II arrives in his native Poland on his first official, nine-day stay, becoming the first Pope to visit a Communist country. This visit, known as nine days that changed the world, brings about the solidarity of the Polish people against Communism, ultimately leading to the rise of the Solidarity movement.
 Los Angeles' city council passes the city's first homosexual rights bill signed without fanfare by mayor Tom Bradley.
 June 3
 Ixtoc I oil spill: A blowout at the Ixtoc I oil well in the southern Gulf of Mexico causes at least 600,000 tons (176,400,000 gallons) of oil to be spilled into the waters, the worst oil spill to date. Some estimate the spill to be 428 million gallons, making it the largest unintentional oil spill until it is surpassed by the Deepwater Horizon oil spill in 2010.
 1979 Italian general election: The Italian Communist Party loses a significant number of seats.
 June 4
 Joe Clark becomes Canada's 16th and youngest Prime Minister.
 Flight Lieutenant Jerry Rawlings takes power in Ghana after a military coup in which General Fred Akuffo is overthrown.
 Following the "Muldergate" Information Scandal, John Vorster resigns as State President of South Africa.
 June 7 – 1979 European Parliament election: The first direct elections to the European Parliament begin, allowing citizens from across all nine (at this time) member states of the European Union to elect 410 MEPs. It is also the first international election in history.
 June 12 – Bryan Allen flies the man-powered Gossamer Albatross across the English Channel.
 June 15
 McDonald's introduces the Happy Meal in the United States in a nationwide advertising campaign after testing the product since February in franchises in the U.S. state of Missouri.
 The ecological horror-thriller Prophecy is released in the United States by Paramount Pictures.
 June 18 – Jimmy Carter and Leonid Brezhnev sign the SALT II agreement in Vienna.
 June 19 – Marais Viljoen becomes State President of South Africa.
 June 20 – A Nicaraguan National Guard soldier kills ABC TV news correspondent Bill Stewart and his interpreter Juan Espinosa. Other members of the news crew capture the killing on tape.
 June 22 
The Muppet Movie is released.
 Former Liberal Party leader Jeremy Thorpe was acquitted of conspiracy to murder Norman Scott, who had accused Thorpe of having a relationship with him. 
 June 23 – New South Wales Premier Neville Wran officially opens the Eastern Suburbs Railway in Sydney. It operates as a shuttle between Central and Bondi Junction until full integration with the Illawarra Line in 1980. 
 June 24 – The Permanent Peoples' Tribunal, an international opinion tribunal, is founded in Bologna at the initiative of Senator Lelio Basso.
 June 25 – NATO Supreme Allied Commander Alexander Haig escapes an assassination attempt in Belgium by the Baader-Meinhof terrorist organization.

July

 July 1
 Sweden becomes the first country to outlaw corporal punishment in the home.
 The Sony Walkman goes on sale for the first time in Japan.
 July 3 – U.S. President Jimmy Carter signs the first directive for secret aid to the opponents of the pro-Soviet regime in Afghanistan.
 July 5 – Queen Elizabeth II attends the millennium celebrations of the Isle of Man's Parliament, Tynwald.
 July 8 – Los Angeles passes its gay and lesbian civil rights bill.
 July 9 – A car bomb destroys a Renault owned by Nazi hunters Serge and Beate Klarsfeld at their home in France. A note purportedly from ODESSA claims responsibility.
 July 11 – NASA's first orbiting space station, Skylab, begins falling back Earth as its orbit decays after more than six years.
 July 12
 The Gilbert Islands become fully independent of the United Kingdom as Kiribati.
 A Disco Demolition Night publicity stunt goes awry at Comiskey Park, forcing the Chicago White Sox to forfeit their game against the Detroit Tigers.
 Carmine Galante, boss of the Bonanno crime family, is assassinated in Brooklyn.
 A fire at a hotel in Zaragoza, Spain, leaves 72 dead, the worst hotel fire in Europe in decades.
 July 15 – President Jimmy Carter addresses the nation in a televised speech talking about the "crisis of confidence in America today"; it would go on to be known as his "national malaise" speech.
 July 16 – Iraqi President Hasan al-Bakr resigns and Vice President Saddam al-Tikriti, more commonly referred to in the Western press as "Saddam Hussein", replaces him.
 July 17 – Nicaraguan president General Anastasio Somoza Debayle resigns and flees to Miami.
 July 21
 The Sandinista National Liberation Front concludes a successful revolutionary campaign against the Somoza dynasty and assumes power in Nicaragua.
 Maria de Lourdes Pintasilgo becomes prime minister of Portugal.
 Maritza Sayalero of Venezuela wins the Miss Universe pageant; the stage collapses after contestants and news photographers rush to her throne.
 The disco music genre dominates and peaks on the Billboard Hot 100 chart, with the first six spots (beginning with Donna Summer's Bad Girls), and seven of the chart's top ten songs ending that week.
 July 22 – 1979 Ba'ath Party Purge: Iraqi president Saddam Hussein arranges the arrest and later execution of nearly seventy members of his ruling Ba'ath Party.
 July 28 – Morarji Desai resigns as India's prime minister and Charan Singh succeeds him.

August

 August 3 – Dictator Francisco Macías Nguema of Equatorial Guinea is overthrown in a bloody coup d'état led by Teodoro Obiang Nguema Mbasogo.
 August 4 – Opening game of the American Football Bundesliga played between Frankfurter Löwen and Düsseldorf Panther, first-ever league game of American football in Germany.
 August 5 – The Polisario Front signs a peace treaty with Mauritania. Mauritania withdraws from the Western Sahara territory it had occupied, and cedes it to the SADR.
 August 6 - Bauhaus releases their debut single "Bela Lugosi's Dead", considered to be the first gothic rock release. 
The legal repercussions of the accident will lead to important safety changes in the diving industry.
 August 9 – Raymond Washington, co-founder of the Crips, today one of the largest, most notorious gangs in the United States, is killed in a drive-by shooting in Los Angeles; the killers have not yet been identified.
 August 10 – Michael Jackson releases his breakthrough album Off the Wall. It sells 7 million copies in the United States alone, making it a 7× platinum album.
 August 11
 The former Mauritanian province of Tiris al-Gharbiyya in Western Sahara is annexed by Morocco.
 The Machchu-2 dam in Morbi, India, collapses, killing between 1800 and 25000 people in one of the worst ever dam failures.
 August 14 – A freak storm during the Fastnet Race results in the deaths of 15 sailors.
 August 17 – The controversial religious satirical film Monty Python's Life of Brian premieres in the United States.
 August 27 – The Troubles: Lord Mountbatten of Burma and two others are killed in a bombing on his boat in the Republic of Ireland by the Provisional Irish Republican Army (IRA). Mountbatten was a British admiral, statesman and an uncle of The Duke of Edinburgh. On the same day, the Warrenpoint ambush occurs, killing 18 British soldiers. Doreen Knatchbull, Baroness Brabourne would die in a hospital the following day from injuries sustained in the bombing.
 August 29 – A national referendum is held in which Somali voters approve a new liberal constitution, promulgated by President Siad Barre to placate the United States.

September

 September 1
 Sri Lanka Army Women's Corps is formed.
 September 7 – The first cable sports channel, the Entertainment Sports Programming Network (better known as ESPN), is launched in the United States.
 September 9 – The long-running comic strip For Better or For Worse begins its run, in Canada, before becoming syndicated elsewhere in North America and the world.
 September 12 – Hurricane Frederic makes landfall at 10:00 p.m. on Alabama's Gulf Coast.
 September 13 – South Africa grants independence to the "homeland" of Venda (not recognised outside South Africa).
 September 16
 East German balloon escape: Two families flee from East Germany by balloon.
 The Sugarhill Gang release Rapper's Delight in the United States, the first rap single to become a Top 40 hit on the Billboard Hot 100.
 September 20 – French paratroopers help David Dacko to overthrow Emperor Bokassa in the Central African Republic.
 September 22 – Vela incident: The "South Atlantic Flash" is observed near the Prince Edward Islands in the Indian Ocean, thought to be a nuclear weapons test conducted by South Africa and Israel.
 September 29 – The overthrown dictator Francisco Macías Nguema of Equatorial Guinea is convicted of genocide and executed by firing squad.
 September 30 – The Hong Kong MTR metro begins service with the opening of its Modified Initial System, the Kwun Tong Line.

October

 October 1 – Nigeria terminates military rule, and the Second Nigerian Republic is established.
 October 1–7 – Pope John Paul II visits the United States, starting in Boston.
 October 1 – The MTR, the rapid transit railway system in Hong Kong, opens.
 October 2 – Pope John Paul II arrives in New York City for his first papal tour where he addresses the U.N. General Assembly against all forms of concentration camps and torture.
 October 6 – Federal Reserve System changes from an interest rate target policy to a money supply target policy.
 October 7 – Pope John Paul II ends his first U.S. papal visit in Washington, D.C. with his first-ever visit to the White House.
 October 9 – Peter Brock wins the Bathurst 1000 by a record six laps, with a lap record on the last lap.
 October 12
 Near Guam, Typhoon Tip reaches a record intensity of 870 millibars, the lowest pressure recorded at sea level. This makes Tip the most powerful tropical cyclone in known world history.
 Thorbjörn Fälldin returns as Prime Minister of Sweden, replacing Ola Ullsten who is named Foreign Minister of Sweden.
 The Hitchhiker's Guide to the Galaxy, the first novel by Douglas Adams, is published in the United Kingdom
 October 14 – National March for gay rights takes place in Washington, D.C., involving tens of thousands of people.
 October 15 – Black Monday events, in which members of a political group sack a newspaper office, unfold in Malta.
 October 16 – A tsunami in Nice, France kills 23 people.
 October 17 – The Pittsburgh Pirates become only the fourth MLB team (as well as the only MLB franchise to accomplish the feat twice) to recover from a 3-games-to-1 deficit to win the 1979 World Series.
 October 19 – 13 U.S. Marines die in a fire at Camp Fuji, Japan as a result of Typhoon Tip.
 October 20 – The first McDonald's in Singapore opens at Liat Towers in Orchard Road.
 October 26 – 
Park Chung-hee, the President of South Korea, is assassinated by KCIA director Kim Jae-gyu.
The eradication of the smallpox virus is announced by the World Health Organization, making smallpox the first of only two human diseases that have been driven to extinction (rinderpest in 2011 being the other).
 October 27 – Saint Vincent and the Grenadines gains independence from the UK.
 October 31 – Western Airlines Flight 2605 crashes upon landing at Mexico City International Airport, killing 72 occupants plus one on the ground; 16 people on board survive.

November

 November 1
 Military coup in Bolivia.
 Iran hostage crisis: Iranian Ayatollah Ruhollah Khomeini urges his people to demonstrate on November 4 and to expand attacks on United States and Israeli interests.
 November 2
 French police shoot gangster Jacques Mesrine in Paris.
 Assata Shakur (née Joanne Chesimard), a former member of the Black Panther Party and Black Liberation Army, escapes from a New York prison to Cuba, where she remains under political asylum.
 November 3 – In Greensboro, North Carolina, five members of the Communist Workers Party are shot to death and seven are wounded by a group of Klansmen and neo-Nazis, during a "Death to the Klan" rally.
 November 4 – Iran hostage crisis begins: 500 Iranian radicals, mostly students, invade the U.S. Embassy in Tehran and take 90 hostages (53 of whom are American). They demand that the United States send the former Shah of Iran back to stand trial.
 November 5
 All Saints' Massacre: The military junta in Bolivia initiates a violent crack-down on its opponents.
 The radio news program Morning Edition premieres on National Public Radio in the United States.
 November 6 – At Montevideo, Uruguay, the International Olympic Committee adopts a resolution, whereby Taiwan Olympic and sports teams will participate with the name Chinese Taipei in future Olympic Games and international sports tournaments and championships.
 November 7 – U.S. Senator Ted Kennedy announces that he will challenge President Jimmy Carter for the 1980 Democratic presidential nomination.
 November 9
 The Carl Bridgewater murder trial ends in England with all four men found guilty. James Robinson, 45, and 25-year-old Vincent Hickey are sentenced to life imprisonment with a recommended 25-year minimum for murder. 18-year-old Michael Hickey is also found guilty of murder and sentenced to indefinite detention. Patrick Molloy, 53, is found guilty on a lesser charge of manslaughter and sentenced to 12 years in prison.
 Nuclear false alarm: the NORAD computers and the Alternate National Military Command Center in Fort Ritchie, Maryland, detect an apparent massive Soviet nuclear strike. After reviewing the raw data from satellites and checking the early-warning radars, the alert is cancelled.
 November 10 – 1979 Mississauga train derailment: A 106-car Canadian Pacific freight train carrying explosive and poisonous chemicals from Windsor, Ontario, Canada derails in Mississauga, just west of Toronto, causing a massive explosion and the largest peacetime evacuation in Canadian history and one of the largest in North American history.
 November 12
 Iran hostage crisis: In response to the hostage situation in Tehran, U.S. President Jimmy Carter orders a halt to all oil imports into the United States from Iran.
 Süleyman Demirel, of the Justice Party (AP) forms the new government of Turkey (43rd government, a minority government).
 November 13 - Ronald Reagan announced his candidacy for President of the United States.
 November 14 – Iran hostage crisis: U.S. President Jimmy Carter issues Executive Order 12170, freezing all Iranian assets in the United States and U.S. banks in response to the hostage crisis.
 November 15 – British art historian and former Surveyor of the Queen's Pictures Anthony Blunt's role as the "fourth man" of the 'Cambridge Five' double agents for the Soviet NKVD during World War II is revealed by Prime Minister Margaret Thatcher in the House of Commons of the United Kingdom; she gives further details on November 21.
 November 16 – Bucharest Metro Line One is opened, in Bucharest, Romania (from Timpuri Noi to Semanatoarea stations).
 November 17 – Iran hostage crisis: Iranian leader Ruhollah Khomeini orders the release of 13 female and African American hostages being held at the U.S. Embassy in Tehran.
 November 20 – Grand Mosque seizure: A group of 200 Juhayman al-Otaybi militants occupy Mecca's Masjid al-Haram, the holiest place in Islam. They are driven out by Saudi military forces after bloody fighting that leaves 250 people dead and 600 wounded.
 November 21 – After false radio reports from the Ayatollah Khomeini that the Americans had occupied the Grand Mosque in Mecca, the United States Embassy in Islamabad, Pakistan is attacked by a mob and set afire, killing 4, and disturbing Pakistan–United States relations.
 November 23 – The Troubles: In Dublin, Ireland, Provisional Irish Republican Army member Thomas McMahon is sentenced to life in prison for the assassination of Lord Mountbatten of Burma in August. He was released in 1998 under the terms of the Good Friday Agreement.
 November 25 – The last cargo of phosphate was shipped from Banaba Island in Kiribati in the South Pacific Ocean, bringing an end to the island's chief industry.
 November 28 – Air New Zealand Flight 901: an Air New Zealand DC-10 crashes into Mount Erebus in Antarctica on a sightseeing trip, killing all 257 people on board.
 November 30 – The Wall, a rock opera and concept album by Pink Floyd, is first released.

December 

 December 3
 The Who concert disaster: Eleven fans are killed during a crowd crush for unreserved seats before The Who rock concert at the Riverfront Coliseum in Cincinnati.
 The United States dollar exchange rate with the Deutsche Mark falls to 1.7079 DM, the all-time low so far; this record is not broken until November 5, 1987.
 Ayatollah Ruhollah Khomeini becomes the first Supreme Leader of Iran.
 December 4 – The Hastie fire in Kingston upon Hull, England, leads to the deaths of 3 boys and begins the hunt for Bruce George Peter Lee, the UK's most prolific killer.
 December 5 – Jack Lynch resigns as Taoiseach of the Republic of Ireland; he is succeeded by Charles Haughey.
 December 6 – The world premiere of Star Trek: The Motion Picture is held at the Smithsonian Institution in Washington, D.C.
 December 12
 The NATO Double-Track Decision: is the decision of NATO from December 12, 1979, to offer the Warsaw Pact a mutual limitation of medium-range ballistic missiles and intermediate-range ballistic missiles combined with the threat that in case of disagreement NATO would deploy more middle-range nuclear weapons in Western Europe, following the so-called "Euromissile Crisis". 
 The 8.2  Tumaco earthquake shakes Colombia and Ecuador with a maximum Mercalli intensity of IX (Violent), killing 300–600, and generating a large tsunami.
 Coup d'état of December Twelfth: South Korean Army Major General Chun Doo-hwan orders the arrest of Army Chief of Staff General Jeong Seung-hwa without authorization from President Choi Kyu-hah, alleging involvement in the assassination of ex-President Park Chung-hee.
 The unrecognised state of Zimbabwe Rhodesia returns to British control and resumes using the name Southern Rhodesia.
 December 13 – The government of Canada falls in a non-confidence motion.
 December 15 – The directorial debut of Hayao Miyazaki, The Castle of Cagliostro based on the manga series Lupin III is released in Japan.
 December 21 – A ceasefire for Rhodesia is signed at London.
 December 23 – The highest aerial tramway in Europe, the Klein Matterhorn, opens.
 December 24
 The Soviet Union covertly launches its invasion of Afghanistan - 3 days later, PDPA general secretary Hafizullah Amin is executed in Operation Storm-333 and Babrak Karmal replaces him, beginning the war.
 The first European Ariane rocket is launched.
 December 26 – In Rhodesia, 96 Patriotic Front guerrillas enter the capital Salisbury to monitor a ceasefire that begins December 28.

Date unknown 
 The One-child policy is introduced in China – it contributes to Missing women of China. It was loosened in 2013.
 Hànyǔ Pīnyīn is widely adopted as the official romanization system for Standard Chinese, leading to changes in Western spelling of Chinese toponyms.
 VisiCalc becomes the first commercial spreadsheet program.
 The first usenet experiments are conducted by Tom Truscott and Jim Ellis of Duke University.
 Worldwide per capita oil production reaches a historic peak.
 The remains of Tsar Nicholas II and some of the Romanovs are discovered and exhumed near Sverdlovsk (now Yekaterinburg).
 NBC introduces a new version of its famous peacock, used in conjunction with the 1975-style N, for the Fall season.
Onde Tem Bruxa Tem Fada, book is published.
 China International Trust Investment Group (CITIC) founded.

Births

January 

 January 1
 Brody Dalle, Australian singer
 Vidya Balan, Indian actress
 Gisela, Spanish pop singer and voice actress
 January 2 
Erica Hubbard, American actress
Jagmeet Singh, Canadian politician, leader of the New Democratic Party
 January 3
 Koit Toome, Estonian singer and musical actor
 Rie Tanaka, Japanese voice actress
 January 4 – Kevin Kuske, German Olympic bobsledder
 January 6
 Christina Chanée, Danish-Thai pop singer
 Bernice Liu, Hong Kong actress
 January 7
 Bipasha Basu, Indian actress and model
 Aloe Blacc, American singer and rapper
 Christian Lindner, German politician
 January 8
 Seol Ki-hyeon, South Korean footballer
 Adrian Mutu, Romanian footballer
 Stipe Pletikosa, Croatian football goalkeeper
 Sarah Polley, Canadian actress, writer, director, producer and political activist
 January 9
 Tomiko Van, Japanese singer (Do As Infinity)
 Bipasha Basu, Indian actress and model
 Hannah Yeoh, Malaysian politician
 January 10 – Francesca Piccinini, Italian volleyball player
 January 11
 Terence Morris, American basketball player 
Siti Nurhaliza, Malaysian singer
 January 12
 Marián Hossa, Slovak ice hockey player
 Lee Bo-young, South Korean actress and model
 Grzegorz Rasiak, Polish footballer
 January 13 
 María de Villota, Spanish racing driver (d. 2013)
 Yang Wei, Chinese badminton player
 January 15
 Drew Brees, American football player
 Martin Petrov, Bulgarian footballer
 January 16 – Aaliyah, American R&B singer and actress (d. 2001)
 January 17 
 Sharon Chan, Hong Kong actress
 Masae Ueno, Japanese judoka
 January 18
 Jay Chou, Taiwanese singer, song producer and actor
 Paulo Ferreira, Portuguese footballer
 Roberta Metsola, Maltese politician
 Leo Varadkar, 14th Taoiseach of Ireland
 January 19 – Svetlana Khorkina, Russian artistic gymnast
 January 20
 Rob Bourdon, American drummer (Linkin Park)
 Asaka Kubo, Japanese gravure idol
 Will Young, English singer
 January 21
 Brian O'Driscoll, Irish rugby union player
 Inul Daratista, Indonesian dangdut singer
 Johann Hari, Scot-Swiss Journalist and author
 January 23 – Larry Hughes, American basketball player
 January 24 
 Tatyana Ali, American actress
 Christine Lakin, American actress
 January 25 – Sheila Cherfilus-McCormick, American politician and businesswoman
 January 26 
 ACM Neto, Brazilian lawyer and politician
 Sara Rue, American actress
 January 27
 Daniel Vettori, New Zealand cricketer
 January 29 – Christina Koch, American engineer and NASA astronaut
 January 31 – Jenny Wolf, German speed skater

February 

 February 1
 Mahek Chahal, Norwegian actress and model
 Valentín Elizalde, Mexican singer (d. 2006)
 Peter Fulton, New Zealand cricketer
 Juan, Brazilian football player and coach
 Rachelle Lefevre, Canadian actress
 Clodoaldo Silva, Brazilian paralympian swimmer
 February 2
 Fani Chalkia, Greek athlete
 Mayer Hawthorne, American soul singer
 Christine Lampard, Northern Irish television presenter
 Shamita Shetty, Indian actress and interior designer
 February 4
Andrei Arlovski, Belarusian mixed martial artist
 Jodi Shilling, American actress
 Tabitha Brown, American actress
 February 5
 Paulo Gonçalves, Portuguese rally racing motorcycle rider (d. 2020) 
 Ilaria Salvatori, Italian fencer
 February 7
 Cerina Vincent, American actress and writer
 Tawakkol Karman, Yemeni politician, Nobel Peace Prize laureate
 February 8
 Josh Keaton, American actor
 Aleksey Mishin, Russian wrestler
 February 9
 Ânderson Polga, Brazilian footballer
 Irina Slutskaya, Russian figure skater
 Zhang Ziyi, Chinese actress and model
 February 10 – Paul Waggoner, American guitarist (Between the Buried and Me)
 February 11 – Brandy Norwood, African-American singer and actress
 February 12 – Jesse Spencer, Australian actor
 February 13
 Anders Behring Breivik, Norwegian far-right terrorist responsible for the 2011 Norway attacks
 Mena Suvari, American actress
 Rafael Márquez, Mexican footballer
 February 14 
 Wesley Moodie, South African tennis player
 Jocelyn Quivrin, French actor (d. 2009)
 February 16
 Valentino Rossi, Italian seven-time MotoGP world champion
 Eric Mun, leader of Korean boy-band Shinhwa
 February 17 – Cara Black, Zimbabwean tennis player
 February 19
 Mariana Ochoa, Mexican singer and actress
 Vitas, Ukrainian and Russian singer and actor
 February 20 – Song Chong-gug, South Korean footballer
 February 21
 Maria Annus, Estonian actress
 Carly Colón, Puerto Rican professional wrestler
 Nathalie Dechy, French tennis player
 Jennifer Love Hewitt, American actress and singer
 Jordan Peele, American actor, comedian, writer, director, and producer
 February 25 – László Bodnár, Hungarian footballer
 February 26
 Corinne Bailey Rae, British singer-songwriter and guitarist
 Susana Diazayas, Mexican actress
 Ngô Thanh Vân, Norwegian-Vietnamese actress, singer and model
 February 28
 Michael Bisping, British mixed martial artist
 Sébastien Bourdais, French racing driver
 Sander van Doorn, Dutch DJ and electronic music producer
 Ivo Karlović, Croatian tennis player

March 

 March 4
 Ben Fouhy, New Zealand flatwater canoeist
 Geoff Huegill, Australian swimmer
 March 5
 Martin Axenrot, Swedish metal drummer
 Riki Lindhome, American actress and comedian
 Tang Gonghong, Chinese weightlifter
 March 6 
 Érik Bédard, Canadian pitcher
 Tim Howard, American soccer player
 March 7
 Stephanie Anne Mills, Canadian voice actress
 Ricardo Rosselló, Puerto Rican politician, Governor of Puerto Rico
 March 8
 Jasmine You, Japanese musician (d. 2009)
 Tom Chaplin, British singer (Keane)
 March 9
 Oscar Isaac, Guatemalan-American actor
 Melina Perez, American professional wrestler
 March 12 – Pete Doherty, British singer and guitarist (The Libertines, Babyshambles)
 March 13 – Johan Santana, Venezuelan baseball player
 March 14
 Nicolas Anelka, French footballer
 Gao Ling, Chinese badminton player
 Chris Klein, American actor
 Michele Riondino, Italian actor
 March 16 – Adriana Fonseca, Mexican actress and dancer 
 March 17 – Samoa Joe, American professional wrestler
 March 18
 Shola Ama, English singer
 Adam Levine, American singer (Maroon 5)
 March 19
 Emil Dimitriev, Macedonian politician, Prime Minister
 Ivan Ljubičić, Croatian tennis player and coach
 Hedo Türkoğlu, Turkish basketball player
 March 20
 Freema Agyeman, British actress
 Daniel Cormier, American retired mixed martial artist
 Bianca Lawson, American actress
 Silvia Navarro, Spanish handball player
 March 23
 Mark Buehrle, American baseball player
 Bryan Fletcher, American football player
 Misty Hyman, American swimmer
 March 24 – Gaitana, Ukrainian singer and songwriter
 March 25
 Lee Pace, American actor
 Gorilla Zoe, American rapper
 March 26 – Juliana Paes, Brazilian actress and model
 March 28 – Shakib Khan, Bangladeshi film actor, producer, singer, film organiser and media personalities
 March 29 – Estela Giménez, Spanish gymnast
 March 30
 Daniel Arenas, Colombian-Mexican actor
 Jose Pablo Cantillo, American actor
 Norah Jones, American musician
 Anatoliy Tymoshchuk, Ukrainian football player and coach

April 

 April 1 – Ruth Beitia, Spanish high jumper and politician
 April 2
 Lindy Booth, Canadian actress
 Jesse Carmichael, American musician (Maroon 5) 
 April 3
 Živilė Balčiūnaitė, Lithuanian long-distance runner
 Grégoire, French singer-songwriter
 Sasa Ognenovski, Australian footballer
 April 4
 Heath Ledger, Australian actor and music video director (d. 2008)
 Roberto Luongo, Canadian ice hockey goaltender
 Maksim Opalev, Russian canoeist
 April 5 – Timo Hildebrand, German footballer
 April 8
 Mohamed Kader, Togolese footballer
 Alexi Laiho, Finnish musician (Children of Bodom) (d. 2020)
 David Petruschin, American drag queen
 April 9
 Sebastián Silva, Chilean director, actor, screenwriter, painter and musician
 Keshia Knight Pulliam, African-American actress
 Mario Matt, Austrian alpine skier
 April 10
 Ryan Agoncillo, Filipino actor and TV personality
 Rachel Corrie, American activist and diarist (d. 2003)
 Tsuyoshi Domoto, Japanese entertainer (KinKi Kids)
 Sophie Ellis-Bextor, British singer
 April 11
 Sebastien Grainger, Canadian singer and musician
 Michel Riesen, Swiss ice hockey player
 Josh Server, American actor
 April 12
 Claire Danes, American actress
 Mateja Kežman, Serbian footballer
 Jennifer Morrison, American actress
 April 13 – Baron Davis, American basketball player 
 April 14
 Pedro Andrade, Brazilian journalist and model
 Rebecca DiPietro, American model
 Pierre Roland, Indonesian actor
 April 15 
 Karen David, Indian born-Canadian actress and singer
 Luke Evans, Welsh actor and singer
 April 17 – Sung Si-kyung, South Korean singer
 April 18
 Michael Bradley, American basketball player
 Anthony Davidson, English racing driver
 Yusuke Kamiji, Japanese actor
 Kourtney Kardashian, American reality television star
 April 19
 Kate Hudson, American actress and co-founder of Fabletics
 Antoaneta Stefanova, Bulgarian chess player
 April 20 – Teoh Beng Hock, Malaysian journalist (d. 2009)
 April 21
 Cindy Kurleto, Filipina-Austrian model and TV personality
 James McAvoy, Scottish actor
 Karin Rask, Estonian actress
 April 22 – Daniel Johns, Australian musician (Silverchair)
 April 23
 Yana Gupta, Indian actress of Czech origin
 Jaime King, American actress
 Joanna Krupa, Polish-born American model and actress
 April 24
 Laurentia Tan, Singaporean Paralympic equestrienne
 Avey Tare, American musician
 Adam Andretti, American race car driver
 April 25
 Andreas Küttel, Swiss ski jumper
 Andrea Osvárt, Hungarian actress
 April 27 – Travis Meeks, American musician (Days of the New)
 April 28 – Bahram Radan, Iranian actor
 April 29
 Jo O'Meara, English singer (S Club 7)
 April 30 – Shelley Calene-Black, American voice actress

May 

 May 1
 Roman Lyashenko, Russian ice hockey player (d. 2003)
 Lars Berger, Norwegian biathlete and cross-country skier
 Mauro Bergamasco, Italian rugby union player
 May 2 – Jason Chimera, Canadian ice hockey player
 May 3
 Danny Foster, English singer (Hear'Say)
 Ingrid Isotamm, Estonian actress
 May 4
 Lance Bass, American singer (NSYNC)
 Wes Butters, English broadcaster
 May 5 – Vincent Kartheiser, American actor
 May 6
 Mark Burrier, American cartoonist
 Kerry Ellis, English stage actress and singer
 Gerd Kanter, Estonian discus thrower
 Jon Montgomery, Canadian former skeleton racer and television personality; host of The Amazing Race Canada
 May 8 – Wendy Armoko, Indonesian singer, actor, presenter and comedian
 May 9
 Pierre Bouvier, Canadian musician
 Rosario Dawson, American actress
 May 10
 Marieke Vervoort, Belgian athlete (d. 2019)
 Lee Hyori, South Korean entertainer
 May 12 – Adrian Serioux, Canadian soccer player
 May 13
 Mickey Madden, American musician (Maroon 5)
 Prince Carl Philip, Duke of Värmland
 May 14 
 Urijah Faber, WEC Featherweight Champion
 Carlos Tenorio, Ecuadorian footballer
 May 15 – James Mackenzie, Scottish actor and TV presenter
 May 16
 Brandon Lee, Filipino-American gay pornographic film actor 
 Jessica Morris, American actress
 Barbara Nedeljáková, Slovak actress
 May 18
 Mariusz Lewandowski, Polish footballer
 Michal Martikán, Slovak slalom canoeist
 Jens Bergensten, Swedish game designer and co-founder of the game company Mojang
 May 19
 Andrea Pirlo, Italian footballer
 Diego Forlán, Uruguayan football player
 May 20 – Andrew Scheer, Canadian politician
 May 21 – Sonja Vectomov, Czech-Finnish electronic musician and composer
 May 22 
 Maggie Q, American actress
Nazanin Boniadi, Iranian-British-American actress 
 May 23 – Rasual Butler, American basketball player (d. 2018)
 May 24
 Frank Mir, American mixed martial artist
 Tracy McGrady, American basketball player
 May 25 – Jonny Wilkinson, English rugby union player
 May 26
 Ashley Massaro, American professional wrestler and model (d. 2019)
 Elisabeth Harnois, American actress
 May 27 – Michael Buonauro, American comic creator
 May 28 – Jesse Bradford, American actor
 May 29 – Brian Kendrick, American wrestler
 May 30
 Clint Bowyer, American race car driver
 Fabian Ernst, German footballer
 Rie Kugimiya, Japanese voice actress and singer

June 

 June 1
 TheFatRat, German musician and producer
 Markus Persson, Swedish video game programmer, designer and creator of Minecraft
 Rhea Santos, Filipina journalist based in Canada
 June 2
 Choirul Huda, Indonesian professional footballer and civil servant (d. 2017)
 Morena Baccarin, Brazilian actress
 June 3 – Pierre Poilievre, Canadian politician
 June 4 – Naohiro Takahara, Japanese football player and coach
 June 5
 François Sagat, French male gay porn film actor, model and director
 Pete Wentz, American musician, lyricist and bassist (Fall Out Boy)
 June 6 
 Solenne Figuès, French swimmer
 Shanda Sharer, American murder victim (d. 1992)
 June 7
 Anna Torv, Australian actress
 Kevin Hofland, Dutch footballer
 June 8
 Pete Orr, Canadian baseball player
 Eddie Hearn, British promoter
 June 9 – Émilie Loit, French tennis player
 June 10 – Lee Brice, American country music singer-songwriter
 June 12
 Robyn, Swedish singer-songwriter
 Amandine Bourgeois, French singer
 Diego Milito, Argentine football player
 June 13
 Nila Håkedal, Norwegian beach volleyball player
 Ágnes Csomor, Hungarian actress
 June 14 – Paradorn Srichaphan, Thai tennis player
 June 15 – Yulia Nestsiarenka, Belarusian athlete
 June 16 – Ari Hest, American singer-songwriter
 June 17 
 Young Maylay, American actor, record producer and rapper
 Nick Rimando, American soccer player
 June 18
 Yumiko Kobayashi, Japanese voice actress
 Chris Neil, Canadian ice hockey player
 Pini Balili, Israeli-Turkish footballer and manager
 Ivana Wong, Hong Kong singer-songwriter
 June 19
 José Kléberson, Brazilian football player and coach
 Kate Tsui, Hong Kong actress
 June 21
 Chris Pratt, American actor
 Makasini Richter, Tongan rugby league player
 June 22
 Sandra Klösel, German tennis player
 Jai Rodriguez, American actor and musician
 June 23
 Marilyn Agliotti, Dutch field hockey player
 LaDainian Tomlinson, American football player
 June 24
 Petra Němcová, Czech model
 Joaquín de Orbegoso, Peruvian actor
 Craig Shergold, British cancer patient
 Mindy Kaling, American actress, comedian and author
 June 25
 Busy Philipps, American film actress
 June 26
 Ryan Tedder, American singer (OneRepublic), songwriter and producer
 Julia Benson, Canadian actress
 June 27
 Cazwell, American rapper and songwriter
 Scott Taylor, American politician
 Fabrizio Miccoli, Italian professional footballer
 June 28
 Felicia Day, American actress, writer, director, violinist and singer
 Randy McMichael, American football player
 June 29
 Lee Hee-joon, South Korean actor
 Abz Love, English singer (5ive)
 Marleen Veldhuis, Dutch swimmer
 Yehuda Levi, Israeli actor and male model
 Liliana Castro, Ecuadorian-born Brazilian actress
 Artur Avila, Brazilian and French mathematician
 June 30
 Rick Gonzalez, American actor
 Ed Kavalee, Australian comedian, actor, radio and television host
 Faisal Shahzad, Pakistani-American bomber
 Matisyahu, Jewish-American reggae vocalist, beatboxer and alternative rock musician
 Nelson Lucas, Seychellois sprinter
 Christopher Jacot, Canadian actor
 Andy Burrows, English songwriter and musician

July 

 July 1
 Forrest Griffin, American mixed martial arts fighter
 Patrik Baboumian, German-Iranian strongman competitor, strength athlete and bodybuilder
 July 2
 Diana Gurtskaya, Georgian singer
 Sam Hornish Jr., American race car driver
 July 3
 Sayuri Katayama, Japanese actress, singer and lyricist
 Ludivine Sagnier, French model and actress
 July 5
 Shane Filan, Irish singer (Westlife)
 Amélie Mauresmo, French tennis player
 July 6
 Mohsen Bengar, Iranian footballer
 Kevin Hart, American actor, comedian, writer and producer
 July 7
 Pat Barry, American kickboxer and mixed martial artist
 Douglas Hondo, Zimbabwean cricketer
 July 9
 Gary Chaw, Malaysian Chinese singer
 Ella Koon, Hong Kong actress
 July 10 – Gong Yoo, South Korean actor
 July 11
 Marina Gatell, Spanish actress
 Im Soo-jung, South Korean actress
 July 13 
 Laura Benanti, American actress and singer
 Ladyhawke, New Zealand singer-songwriter
 July 14
 Axel Teichmann, German cross-country skier
 Scott Porter, American actor and singer 
 July 15 
 Travis Fimmel, Australian fashion model and actor
 Alexander Frei, Swiss footballer
 July 16
 Jim Banks, American politician
 Kinya Kotani, Japanese singer
 Kim Rhode, American double trap and skeet shooter
 Landy Wen, Taiwanese singer
 July 17 – Mike Vogel, American actor
 July 19
 Malavika, Indian actress
 David Sakurai, Danish-Japanese actor, director, scriptwriter and martial artist
 Bruno Cabrerizo, Brazilian football player, model and actor
 July 20
 Claudine Barretto, Filipino film actress, television actress, entrepreneur and product endorser
 Marcos Mion, Brazilian TV host, actor, voice actor and businessman
 Milan Nikolić, Serbian accordionist
 Adam Rose, South African professional wrestler
 Amr Shabana, Egyptian squash player
 July 21 
 Tamika Catchings, American basketball player
 Andriy Voronin, Ukrainian footballer
 July 23 – Michelle Williams, American singer and actress      
 July 24 – Rose Byrne, Australian actress
 July 25
 Juan Pablo Di Pace, Argentinian actor and singer 
 Allister Carter, English snooker player
 July 26
 Johnson Beharry, British recipient of the Victoria Cross
 Tamyra Gray, American singer
 Derek Paravicini, British pianist
 Yūko Sano, Japanese volleyball player
 Mageina Tovah, American actress
 July 27
 Marielle Franco, Brazilian politician (d. 2018)
 Jorge Arce, Mexican boxer
 Shannon Moore, American professional wrestler
 July 30
 Carlos Arroyo, Puerto Rican basketball player 
 Show Lo, Taiwanese singer
 Graeme McDowell, Northern Irish professional golfer
 Maya Nasser, Syrian journalist (d. 2012)
 July 31 – B. J. Novak, American actor, director and producer

August 

 August 1
 Jason Momoa, American actor
 Junior Agogo, Ghanaian footballer (d. 2019)
 Honeysuckle Weeks, British actress
 August 3
 Evangeline Lilly, Canadian actress and author of children's literature
 Maria Haukaas Mittet, Norwegian recording artist
 August 4 – Patryk Dominik Sztyber, Polish rock musician
 August 5 – David Healy, Northern Irish footballer
 August 7
Miguel Llera, Spanish footballer
Gangsta Boo, American rapper (d. 2023)
 August 10
 JoAnna Garcia, American actress
 Ted Geoghegan, American screenwriter
 August 11
 Drew Nelson, Canadian actor and voice actor
 Bubba Crosby, American baseball player
 August 12
 Peter Browngardt, American cartoonist
 Cindy Klassen, Canadian speed skater
 August 13 – Taizō Sugimura, Japanese politician
 August 15
 Carl Edwards, American race car driver
 Peter Shukoff, American comedian, musician and personality
 August 16
 Sarah Balabagan, Filipina prisoner and singer
 August 19 – Oumar Kondé, Swiss footballer
 August 20 – Jamie Cullum, English jazz pianist and singer
 August 22
Matt Walters, American football player
Angelu de Leon, Filipina actress
 August 23
 Mulan Jameela, Indonesian singer and politician
 Ritchie Neville, English singer (5ive)
 August 24
 Elva Hsiao, Taiwanese singer
 Michael Redd, American basketball player
 August 25 – Andrew Hussie, American artist
 August 26
 Jamal Lewis, American football player
 Cristian Mora, Ecuadorian footballer
 August 27
 Giovanni Capitello, American filmmaker and actor
 Tian Liang, Chinese diver
 Aaron Paul, American actor
 August 28
 Robert Hoyzer, German football referee
 Yuki Maeda, Japanese singer
 Shane Van Dyke, American actor
 August 29 – Justine Pasek, Miss Universe 2002
 August 30
 Leon Lopez, British actor, film director, singer-songwriter and occasional model
 Tavia Yeung, Hong Kong actress
 Niki Chow, Hong Kong actress
 August 31
 Mickie James, American professional wrestler
 Simon Neil, Scottish musician (vocalist, guitarist, songwriter), Biffy Clyro Marmaduke Duke
 Yuvan Shankar Raja, Indian film composer

September 

 September 1 
 Neg Dupree, British comedian
 Margherita Granbassi, Italian fencer
 September 2
 Ron Ng, Hong Kong actor
 Łukasz Żygadło, Polish volleyball player
 September 3 – Júlio César, Brazilian football goalkeeper
 September 4 – Maxim Afinogenov, Russian ice hockey player
 September 5
 John Carew, Norwegian footballer
 Stacey Dales, Canadian basketball player and sportscaster
 September 7 – Nathan Hindmarsh, Australian rugby league player 
 September 8 – Pink, American singer and actress
 September 10 
 Mustis, Norwegian pianist
 Laia Palau, Spanish basketball player
 September 11
 Eric Abidal, French footballer
 Cameron Richardson, American actress and model
 David Pizarro, Chilean footballer
 September 12 
 Michelle Dorrance, American tap dancer
 Jay McGraw, American author, son of TV psychologist Dr. Phil McGraw
 September 13 – Ivan Miljković, Serbian volleyball player
 September 14
 Chris John, Indonesian former featherweight boxing champion
 Ivica Olić, Croatian footballer
 September 15
 Dave Annable, American actor
 Amy Davidson, American actress
 Edna Ngeringway Kiplagat, Kenyan long-distance runner
 Patrick Marleau, Canadian ice hockey player
 September 16
 Fanny, French singer
 Flo Rida, African-American rapper
 Soo Ae, South Korean actress
 September 17
 Akin Ayodele, American football player
 Chuck Comeau, Canadian drummer
 September 18
 Junichi Inamoto, Japanese footballer
 Alison Lohman, American actress
 September 19 – Noémie Lenoir, French supermodel
 September 20 – Lars Jacobsen, Danish footballer
 September 21 – Chris Gayle, Jamaican cricketer
 September 22 – MyAnna Buring, Swedish-English actress
 September 23 – Lote Tuqiri, Fijian-Australian rugby player
 September 24
 Justin Bruening, American actor and model
 Erin Chambers, American actress
 Julia Clarete, Filipina actress
 September 25
 Rashad Evans, American retired mixed martial artist
 Michele Scarponi, Italian road bicycle racer (d. 2017)
 September 26
 Naomichi Marufuji, Japanese professional wrestler
 Taavi Rõivas, Prime Minister of Estonia
 September 27
 Zoltán Horváth, Hungarian basketball player (d. 2009)
 Shinji Ono, Japanese football player
 Nathan Foley, Australian performer
 September 28
 Bam Margera, American skateboarder
 Anndi McAfee, American actress and voice actress
 September 29
 Gaitana, Ukrainian singer and songwriter of Ukrainian and Congolese descent
 Artika Sari Devi, Putri Indonesia 2004
 September 30
 Mike Damus, American actor
 Vince Chong, Malaysian singer
 Juho Kuosmanen, Finnish film director and screenwriter

October 

 October 1
 Rudi Johnson, American football player
 Senit, Italian singer of Eritrean descent
 Marko Stanojevic, English-born Italian rugby union player
 October 2 – Brianna Brown, American actress
 October 3
 Josh Klinghoffer, American musician (Red Hot Chili Peppers)
 John Morrison, American professional wrestler
 October 4
 Caitriona Balfe, Irish model and actress
 Rachael Leigh Cook, American actress
 Adam Voges, Australian cricketer
 October 5 – Gao Yuanyuan, Chinese actress
 October 6 – Mohamed Kallon, Sierra Leonean football player and coach
 October 7
 Aaron Ashmore, Canadian film and television actor
 Shawn Ashmore, Canadian film and television actor
 Simona Amânar, Romanian gymnast
 Tang Wei, Chinese actress
 October 8 – Kristanna Loken, American actress and model
 October 9
 Csézy, Hungarian singer
 Chris O'Dowd, Irish actor and comedian
 Brandon Routh, American actor
 Gonzalo Sorondo, Uruguayan footballer
 October 10
 Wu Chun, Bruneian actor, model and singer
 Nicolás Massú, Chilean tennis player
 Mýa, American singer and actress
 October 11
 Bae Doona, South Korean actress
 Gabe Saporta, Uruguayan singer (Cobra Starship)
 October 13 
 Wes Brown, English footballer
 Mamadou Niang, Senegalese footballer
 October 14 – Stacy Keibler, American actress and model
 October 15 – Jaci Velasquez, American Christian singer
 October 17 – Kimi Räikkönen, Finnish 2007 Formula 1 world champion
 October 18 – Ne-Yo, African-American singer and songwriter
 October 20
 John Krasinski, American actor
 Paul O'Connell, Irish rugby union player
Anna Boden, American filmmaker 
 October 23 
 Jorge Solís, Mexican professional boxer
 Prabhas, Indian actor
 October 25 – Sarah Thompson, American actress
 October 28
Glover Teixeira, Brazilian-American mixed martial artist
 Jawed Karim, German and Bangladeshi-American software engineer, Internet entrepreneur and co-founder of YouTube
 Martin Škoula, Czech ice hockey player
 October 30 – Yukie Nakama, Japanese actress

November 

 November 1
 Coco Crisp, American baseball player
 Atsuko Enomoto, Japanese voice actress
 Milan Dudić, Serbian footballer
 November 2 
 Marián Čišovský, Slovak footballer (d. 2020)
 Erika Flores, American actress
 November 3
 Pablo Aimar, Argentine footballer
 Tim McIlrath, American rock singer, songwriter (Rise Against)
 November 4 – Audrey Hollander, American porn actress
 November 5 
 Leonardo Nam, Australian actor
 Tarek Boudali, French actor
 Patrick Owomoyela, German Footballer of Nigerian descent
 November 6
 Lamar Odom, African-American retired basketball player
 Myolie Wu, Hong Kong actress
 November 7 – Jon Peter Lewis, American singer and songwriter
 November 8
 Aaron Hughes, Northern Irish footballer
 Dania Ramirez, Dominican actress
 Dash Berlin, Dutch DJ and music producer
 Salvatore Cascio, Italian actor
 November 9
 Cory Hardrict, American actor
 Darren Trumeter, American actor and comedian
 Caroline Flack, English television and radio presenter and actress (d. 2020)
 November 12
 Matt Cappotelli, American professional wrestler (d. 2018)
 Cote de Pablo, Chilean actress
 Matt Stevic, Australian rules football umpire
 November 13
 Henry Wolfe, American actor and musician
 Metta World Peace, American basketball player
 November 14
 Mavie Hörbiger, German actress
 Olga Kurylenko, Ukrainian model and actress
 Mpule Kwelagobe, Miss Universe 1999
 Osleidys Menéndez, Cuban javelin thrower
 November 17 – Matthew Spring, English footballer
 November 18 – Neeti Mohan, Indian playback singer
 November 19
 Barry Jenkins, American film director, producer, and screenwriter
 Larry Johnson, American football player
 Michelle Vieth, American born Mexican actress and model
 November 20 – Ericson Alexander Molano, Colombian gospel singer
 November 21 
 Kim Dong-wan, South Korean singer and actor
 Vincenzo Iaquinta, Italian footballer
 November 22
 Chris Doran, Irish singer
 Scott Robinson, English singer (5ive)
 Njabuliso Simelane, Swaziland international footballer
 November 23
 Kelly Brook, English actress and model
 Nihat Kahveci, Turkish footballer
 Ivica Kostelić, Croatian alpine skier
 November 24 – Carmelita Jeter, American sprinter
 November 25 – Joel Kinnaman, Swedish-American actor
 November 26 – Deborah Secco, Brazilian actress
 November 27
 Ricky Carmichael, American motorcycle and stock car racer
 Hilary Hahn, American violinist
 November 28
 Dane Bowers, English singer-songwriter (Another Level)
 Jamie Korab, Canadian curler
 Hakeem Seriki, African-American rapper (Chamillionaire)
 Daniel Henney, American actor and model
 November 29 
 Simon Amstell, English comedian and writer
 Jayceon Taylor, American rapper (The Game)
 November 30
 Diego Klattenhoff, Canadian actor
 Andrés Nocioni, Argentinian basketball player

December 

 December 2
 Sabina Babayeva, Azerbaijani singer
 Yvonne Catterfeld, German singer, songwriter, actress, and television personality
 December 3
 Daniel Bedingfield, English pop singer and songwriter
 Rock Cartwright, American football player
 Tiffany Haddish, American actress and comedian
 December 5 – Matteo Ferrari, Italian footballer
 December 6 – Tim Cahill, Australian footballer
 December 7
 Eric Bauza, Canadian comedian and voice actor
 Sara Bareilles, American singer, songwriter and pianist
 Ayako Fujitani, Japanese actress
 Jennifer Carpenter, American actress
 December 8 – Ingrid Michaelson, American indie pop singer-songwriter
 December 10 – Keiko Nemoto, Japanese voice actress
 December 11 – Rider Strong, American actor, director, producer and screenwriter
 December 12
 Emin Agalarov, Azerbaijani-Russian singer-songwriter and businessman
 Barulaganye Bolofete, Botswana footballer
 December 14
 Chris Cheng, American sport shooter 
 Michael Owen, English footballer
 December 15
 Adam Brody, American actor
 Eric Young, Canadian professional wrestler
 Lee Carr, African-American singer and songwriter
 December 16
 Trevor Immelman, South African golfer
 Brodie Lee, American professional wrestler (d. 2020)
 Daniel Narcisse, French handball player
 Mihai Trăistariu, Romanian singer and musician
 December 17 
Jaimee Foxworth, American actress and model
Erion Veliaj, Albanian politician, Mayor of Tirana
 December 19
 Kevin Devine, American songwriter and musician
 Paola Rey, Colombian actress and model
 Tara Summers, English actress
 December 20
 Flávio, Angolan footballer
 Ramon Rodriguez, Puerto Rican actor
 December 21 – Rutina Wesley, American actress
 December 22 
 Eleonora Lo Bianco, Italian volleyball player
 Petra Majdič, Slovene cross-country skier
 December 23
 Jacqueline Bracamontes, Mexican actress and beauty contest winner (Nuestra Belleza México 2000)
 Kenny Miller, Scottish football player
 December 25 – Ferman Akgül, vocalist of Turkish nu-metal band maNga
 December 26
 Chris Daughtry, American singer and guitarist
 Dimitry Vassiliev, Russian ski jumper
 December 28
 James Blake, American tennis player
 André Holland, American actor
 Bree Williamson, Canadian actress
 Robert Edward Davis, German-American rapper
 Zach Hill, American drummer (Death Grips)
 December 29 - Diego Luna, Mexican actor 
December 30
 Flávio Amado, Angolan footballer
 Milana Terloeva, Chechen journalist and author
 Yelawolf, American rapper
 December 31
 Bob Bryar, American drummer (My Chemical Romance)
 Elaine Cassidy, Irish actress
 Josh Hawley, American politician, U.S. Senator (R-MO) from 2019

Deaths

January 

 January 3 – Conrad Hilton, American hotelier (b. 1887)
 January 4 – Vincent Korda, Hungarian art director (b. 1897)
 January 5
 Billy Bletcher, American actor (b. 1894)
 Charles Mingus, American musician (b. 1922)
 January 11 – Jack Soo, Japanese-born American actor (b. 1917)
 January 13 – Donny Hathaway, American musician (b. 1945)
 January 15 – Charles W. Morris,  American philosopher and semiotician (b. 1901)
 January 16 – Ted Cassidy, American actor (b. 1932)
 January 22 – Ali Hassan Salameh, Palestinian Leader of Black September and mastermind of the 1972 Munich Massacre (b. 1940)
 January 26 – Nelson Rockefeller, 41st Vice President of the United States (b. 1908)
 January 27 – Victoria Ocampo, Argentine publisher, writer and critic (b. 1890)

February 

 February 1
 William H. Brockman Jr., United States Navy admiral (b. 1904)
 Abdi İpekçi,  Turkish journalist and human rights activist (b. 1929)
 February 2
 Issa Pliyev, Soviet general (b. 1903)
 Sid Vicious, English musician (b. 1957)
 February 7 – Josef Mengele, German officer and physician (b. 1911)
 February 10 
 Edvard Kardelj, Slovene general, economist, and politician, 2nd Foreign Minister of Yugoslavia (b. 1910)
 Karl von Eberstein, German politician (b. 1894)
 February 12 – Jean Renoir, French film director and actor (b. 1894)
 February 14 – Reginald Maudling, British politician (b. 1917)
 February 17 – William Gargan, American actor (b. 1905)
 February 20 – Nereo Rocco, Italian footballer and manager (b. 1912)
 February 25 – Henrich Focke, German aviation pioneer (b. 1890)

March 

 March 1
 Mustafa Barzani, Iraqi Kurdish politician (b. 1903)
 Dolores Costello, American actress (b. 1903)
 March 15 – Léonide Massine, Russian dancer and choreographer (b. 1896)
 March 18 – Marjorie Daw, American actress (b. 1902)
 March 19 – Richard Beckinsale, British actor (b. 1947)
 March 22 – Ben Lyon, American actor (b. 1901)
 March 24 – Yvonne Mitchell, English actress (b. 1915)
 March 26 – Jean Stafford, American writer (b. 1915)
 March 29 – Sultan Yahya Petra ibni Almarhum Sultan Ibrahim Petra, Sultan of Kelantan and 6th King of Malaysia (b. 1917)
 March 30
 Airey Neave, British politician (assassinated) (b. 1916)
 José María Velasco Ibarra, Ecuadorian politician, 24th President of Ecuador (b. 1893)

April 

 April 4
 Zulfikar Ali Bhutto, 9th Prime Minister of Pakistan and 4th President of Pakistan (executed) (b. 1928)
 Edgar Buchanan, American actor (b. 1903)
 April 10 – Nino Rota, Italian composer (b. 1911)
 April 11 – Hassan Pakravan, Iranian diplomat (b. 1911)
 April 19 – Wilhelm Bittrich, German Waffen SS general (b. 1894)
 April 23 – Blair Peach, New Zealand-born, British teacher (b. 1946)
 April 24 – John Carroll, American actor (b. 1906)
 April 27 – Phan Huy Quát, 4th Prime Minister of South Vietnam (b. 1908)

May 

 May 1 – Morteza Motahhari, Iranian cleric and politician (b. 1919)
 May 2 – Giulio Natta, Italian chemist, Nobel Prize laureate (b. 1903)
 May 6 – Milton Ager, American songwriter (b. 1893)
 May 8 – Talcott Parsons, American sociologist (b. 1902)
 May 11
 Joan Chandler, American actress (b. 1923)
 Barbara Hutton, American socialite (b. 1912)
 May 13 – Predrag Đajić, Bosnian Serb and Yugoslav footballer (b. 1922)
 May 14 – Jean Rhys, Dominican novelist (b. 1890)
 May 16 – A. Philip Randolph, African-American civil rights activist (b. 1889)
 May 27 – Ahmed Ould Bouceif, Mauritanian military officer, second Prime Minister of Mauritania (b. 1934)
 May 29 – Mary Pickford, Canadian-American actress and producer (b. 1892)

June 

 June 1
 Ján Kadár, Czechoslovakian film director (b. 1918)
 Jack Mulhall, American actor (b. 1887)
 June 2 - Jim Hutton, American actor (b. 1934)
 June 5 – Heinz Erhardt, German comedian, musician, entertainer, actor and poet (b. 1909)
 June 6 – Jack Haley, American actor (b. 1897)
 June 8 - Reinhard Gehlen, German general, 20 July Plotter (b. 1902)
 June 9 - Cyclone Taylor, Canadian ice hockey player (b. 1884)
 June 11
 John Wayne, American Academy Award-winning actor and film director (b. 1907)
 Loren Murchison, American Olympic athlete (b. 1898)
 June 13 – Darla Hood, American actress (b. 1931)
 June 16 – Nicholas Ray, American film director, screenwriter and actor (b. 1911)
 June 22 – Louis Chiron, Monacan Grand Prix driver (b. 1899)
 June 25 – Dave Fleischer, American animator (b. 1894)
 June 26 – Akwasi Afrifa, Ghanaian soldier and politician, Head of state (1969–1970) (b. 1936)
 June 28 – Philippe Cousteau, French diver and cinematographer (b. 1940)
 June 29 – Lowell George, American singer, songwriter, multi-instrumentalist, and record producer (b. 1945)

July 

 July 2 – Carlyle Smith Beals, Canadian astronomer (b. 1899)
 July 3 – Louis Durey, French composer (b. 1888)
 July 4 – Theodora Kroeber, American writer and anthropologist (b. 1897)
 July 6
 Antonio María Barbieri, Uruguay Roman Catholic cardinal (b. 1892)
 Van McCoy, American musician noted for his 1975 hit "The Hustle" (b. 1940)
 July 8
 Elizabeth Ryan, American 30 Grand Slam (tennis) Tennis Champion (b. 1892)
 Shin'ichirō Tomonaga, Japanese physicist, Nobel Prize laureate (b. 1906)
 Michael Wilding, English actor (b. 1912)
 Robert Burns Woodward, American chemist, Nobel Prize laureate (b. 1917)
 July 10 – Arthur Fiedler, American conductor (Boston Pops) (b. 1894)
 July 12 – Minnie Riperton, American rhythm and blues singer (Lovin' You) (b. 1947)
 July 13 – Corinne Griffith, American actress and author (b. 1894)
 July 15
 Gustavo Díaz Ordaz, Mexican politician, 49th President of Mexico, 1964-1970 (b. 1911)
 Juana de Ibarbourou, Uruguayan poet (b. 1892)
 July 16 – Alfred Deller, English countertenor (b. 1912)
 July 17 – Edward Akufo-Addo, Ghanese politician and lawyer, 5th President of Ghana (b. 1906)
 July 20 – Sir Herbert Butterfield, English philosopher and historian (b. 1900)
 July 22 – Sándor Kocsis, Hungarian footballer (b. 1929)
 July 28 – George Seaton, American screenwriter and director (b. 1911)
 July 29 – Herbert Marcuse, German-American philosopher, sociologist and political theorist (b. 1898)

August

 August 2
 Víctor Raúl Haya de la Torre, Peruvian politician, founder and leader of APRA party (b. 1895) 
 Thurman Munson, American baseball player (b. 1947) 
 August 3 – Bertil Ohlin, Swedish economist and Liberal politician, recipient of the Nobel Prize in Economic Sciences (b. 1899)
 August 6 – Feodor Lynen, German biochemist, recipient of the Nobel Prize in Physiology or Medicine (b. 1911)
 August 9 – Walter O'Malley, American baseball executive (b. 1903)
 August 10
 Dick Foran, American actor (b. 1910)
 Mohammad Nur Ahmad Etemadi, Afghan politician, 9th Prime Minister of Afghanistan (b. 1921)
 August 12 – Ernst Chain, German-born British biochemist, Nobel Prize laureate (b. 1906)
 August 16 – John Diefenbaker, 13th Prime Minister of Canada (b. 1895)
 August 17 – Vivian Vance, American actress and singer (b. 1909)
 August 19 – Saad Jumaa, Prime Minister of Jordan (b. 1916)
 August 21 – Stuart Heisler, American film and television director (b. 1896)
 August 24
 Ahmad Daouk, Lebanese politician, 12th Prime Minister of Lebanon (b. 1892)
 Hanna Reitsch, German aviator (b. 1912)
 August 25 – Stan Kenton, American jazz pianist (b. 1911)
 August 26
 Alvin Karpis, American criminal (b. 1907)
 Mika Waltari, Finnish author (b. 1908)
 August 27 – Louis Mountbatten, 1st Earl Mountbatten of Burma, British Viceroy of India (assassinated) (b. 1900)
 August 30 (body found on September 8) – Jean Seberg, American actress (b. 1938)
 August 31 – Sally Rand, American dancer (b. 1904)

September 

 September 1 – Doris Kenyon, American actress (b. 1897)
 September 2 – Felix Aylmer, British actor (b. 1889)
 September 5 – Alberto di Jorio, Italian Roman Catholic cardinal (b. 1884)
 September 9 – Norrie Paramor, British music producer (b. 1914)
 September 10 – Agostinho Neto, Angolan poet and politician, 1st President of Angola (b. 1922)
 September 16 
 Giò Ponti, Italian architect, industrial designer, furniture designer and artist (b. 1891)
 Rob Slotemaker, Indonesian-born, Dutch Formula 1 racing car driver (b. 1929) 
 September 20
 Sultan Ismail Nasiruddin Shah, Sultan of Terengganu and 4th King of Malaysia (b. 1907)
 Ludvík Svoboda, 8th President of Czechoslovakia (b. 1895)
 September 22 
 Abul A'la Maududi, Pakistani journalist and philosopher (b. 1903)
 Otto Robert Frisch, Austrian-born British physicist (b. 1904)
 September 24 – Carl Laemmle Jr., American film studio executive (b. 1908)
 September 25 – Yury Kovalyov, Soviet footballer (b. 1934)
 September 26
 John Cromwell, American film director and actor (b. 1887)
 Arthur Hunnicutt, American actor (b. 1910)
 September 27
 Gracie Fields, British actress (b. 1898)
 Jimmy McCulloch, Scottish guitarist (Paul McCartney & Wings) (b. 1953)
 September 29
 Francisco Macías Nguema, 1st President of Equatorial Guinea (executed) (b. 1924)
 Ivan Wyschnegradsky, Russian composer (b. 1893)

October 

 October 1 – Dorothy Arzner, American film director (b. 1897)
 October 6 – Elizabeth Bishop, American poet (b. 1911)
 October 9 – Nur Muhammad Taraki, Afghan revolutionary communist politician, journalist and writer (b. 1917)
 October 13 –  Rebecca Clarke, English composer and violist (b. 1886)
 October 15 – Jacob L. Devers, American army general (b. 1887)
 October 16 – Johan Borgen, Norwegian author (b. 1902)
 October 18 – Virgilio Piñera, Cuban author, playwright and poet (b. 1912)
 October 22 – Nadia Boulanger, French composer and composition teacher (b. 1887)
 October 23 – Antonio Caggiano, Argentine cardinal (b. 1889)
 October 25
 Maphevu Dlamini, 2nd Prime Minister of Swaziland (b. 1922)
 Gerald Templer, British field marshal (b. 1898) 
 October 26 – Park Chung-hee, Korean politician, 3rd President of the Republic of Korea (South Korea) (assassinated) (b. 1917)
 October 27 – Father Charles Coughlin, Canadian-born American priest and controversial conservative radio show commentator (b. 1891)
 October 30
 Barnes Wallis, British aeronautical engineer (b. 1887)
 Rachele Mussolini, Italian, wife of Benito Mussolini (b. 1890)

November 

 November 1
 Albert Préjean, French actor (b. 1894)
 Mamie Eisenhower, 34th First Lady of the United States (b. 1896)
 November 2 – Jacques Mesrine, French criminal; known as the "French Robin Hood" (b. 1936)
 November 5 
 Al Capp, American cartoonist (b. 1909)
 Amedeo Nazzari, Italian actor (b. 1907)
 November 8 – Yvonne de Gaulle, French political wife of former President of France Charles de Gaulle (b. 1900)
 November 11 – Dimitri Tiomkin, Russian film composer (b. 1894)
 November 17 – Immanuel Velikovsky, Russian author and psychiatrist (b. 1895)
 November 23 
 Merle Oberon, British actress (b. 1911)
 Judee Sill, American singer and songwriter (b. 1944)
 November 26 – Marcel L'Herbier, French movie-maker (b. 1888)
 November 30 – Zeppo Marx, American actor and comedian (b. 1901)

December 

 December 3 – Dhyan Chand, Indian hockey player (b. 1905)
 December 5 – Sonia Delaunay, Russian-born French artist (b. 1885)
 December 7 – Cecilia Payne-Gaposchkin, British-born American astronomer and astrophysicist (b. 1900)
 December 9 – Fulton J. Sheen, American Roman Catholic bishop and venerable (b. 1895) 
 December 10 – Ann Dvorak, American actress (b. 1911)
 December 11 – James J. Gibson, American psychologist and academic (b. 1904)
 December 13 – Jon Hall, American actor (b. 1915)
 December 15 – Ethel Lackie, American Olympic swimmer (b. 1907)
 December 16 – Vagif Mustafazadeh, Azerbaijani jazz musician (b. 1940)
 December 21 – Ermindo Onega, Argentine footballer (b. 1940)
 December 22 – Darryl F. Zanuck, American film producer (b. 1902)
 December 23 
 Peggy Guggenheim, American art collector (b. 1898)
 Ernest B. Schoedsack, American film producer and director (b. 1893)
 December 24 – Rudi Dutschke, German radical student leader (b. 1940)
 December 25
 Joan Blondell, American actress (b. 1906)
 Lee Bowman, American actor (b. 1914)
 December 26 – Helmut Hasse, German mathematician (b. 1898)
 December 27 – Hafizullah Amin, 2nd General Secretary of the People's Democratic Party and Chairman of the Revolutionary Council (b. 1929)
 December 28 – Rafael Filiberto Bonnelly, 43rd President of the Dominican Republic (b. 1904) 
 December 30 – Richard Rodgers, American composer (b. 1902)

Nobel Prizes 

 Physics – Sheldon Glashow, Abdus Salam, Steven Weinberg
 Chemistry – Herbert C. Brown, Georg Wittig
 Medicine – Allan MacLeod Cormack, Godfrey Hounsfield
 Literature – Odysseas Elytis
 Peace – Mother Teresa
 Economics – Theodore Schultz, W. Arthur Lewis

Media 
 The Doctor Who story City of Death is set in 1979, its year of broadcast.
 The events of the 2011 science fiction film Super 8 take place during 1979.
 1979 Revolution: Black Friday, an interactive drama video game released in 2016, based on the events of the Iranian Revolution in 1979.

References

Further reading
 Caryl, Christian, Strange Rebels: 1979 and the Birth of the 21st Century (2013), 1979 as worldwide turning point; excerpt and text search
 Facts on File. Facts on File Yearbook: 1979 (1980) weekly factual report on events worldwide.
 Hodson, H.V. Annual Register of World Events 1979 (1980), in-depth coverage of major countries
 Paxton, John, ed. Statesman's Yearbook 1978–1979 (1980), statistical details on all countries